Burley Design (previously Burley Design Cooperative) LLC is a company in Eugene, Oregon, United States that has produced outdoor family products since 1978. Its blue and yellow children's bicycle trailers were among the first on sale, in the early 1980s. In the past, Burley also made bicycles, tandem bicycles, recumbent bicycles, and rain gear. 

Burley was run as a worker-owned cooperative from its inception until June 2006, when the company converted to a private corporation. In September 2006, Burley Design was purchased by Eugene businessman Michael Coughlin. Production of bicycles and apparel ended that month, and the company turned to child, adventure, and pet trailers.

Trailers

 d'lite ST...Smart Transport New for 2009
 Solo ST...Smart Transport New for 2009
 d'lite
 Solo
 Cub
 Encore
 Honey Bee
 Bee
 Nomad
 Flatbed
 Tail Wagon
 Rover
 Travoy (Urban Trailer System) New for 2010

Trailercycles

 Piccolo (attaches to Moose Rack, not seatpost)
 Kazoo (similar to Piccolo, but a single speed)

Upright bicycles (no longer in production)

 Hudson
 Vagabond
 McKenzie
 Sahalie
 Wolf Creek
 Fox Hollow
 Pine Grove
 Harlow
 Runabout

Tandem bicycles (no longer in production)

 Duet
 Rock 'N Roll
 Rumba
 Paso Doble
 Bossa Nova
 Tamberello
 Zydeco
 Samba, mountain bike
 Bongo, mountain bike

Recumbent bicycles (no longer in production)

 Jett Creek - LWB
 Koosah - LWB
 Spider - LWB
 Nasoke - LWB
 Hepcat - SWB
 Django - SWB
 Canto - LWB
 Sand Point - LWB

See also
 Bike Friday
 List of bicycle part manufacturing companies
 List of companies based in Oregon

References

External links
Official website

Cycle parts manufacturers
Cycling in Oregon
Former cooperatives of the United States
Companies based in Eugene, Oregon
Design companies established in 1978
Manufacturing companies established in 1978
1978 establishments in Oregon